A glory hole (also spelled gloryhole and glory-hole) is a hole in a wall or partition, often between public lavatory cubicles or sex video arcade booths and lounges, for people to engage in sexual activity or observe the person in the next cubicle while one or both parties masturbate, tea-bag or fellate.

Glory holes are especially associated with gay male culture, and anal or oral sex, and come from a history of persecution. The partition maintains anonymity and a sense of reassurance that the people involved would not be identified and possibly arrested. However, they are not exclusively favoured by gay people, and have become more commonly acknowledged as a fetish for heterosexual and bisexual couples. 

In more recent years, public glory holes have faded in popularity in many countries, though some gay websites offer directories of the remaining glory holes. 

Glory holes are sometimes the topic of erotic literature, and pornographic films have been devoted to the uses of glory holes.

Motivations
Numerous motivations can be ascribed to the use and eroticism of glory holes. As a wall separates the two participants, they have no contact except for a mouth, a penis, and perhaps a hand. Almost total anonymity is maintained, as no other attributes are taken into consideration. The glory hole is seen as an erotic oasis in gay subcultures around the world; people's motives, experiences and attributions of value in its use are varied.

In light of the ongoing HIV pandemic, many gay men re-evaluated their sexual and erotic desires and practices. It is suggested by queer theorist Tim Dean that glory holes allow for a physical barrier, which may be an extension of psychological barriers, in which there is internalized homophobia (a result of many societies' reluctance towards discussing LGBT practices and people). For some gay men, a glory hole serves to depersonalize their partner altogether as a disembodied object of sexual desire, either sticking through or on the other side of the hole.

History

The first documented instance of a glory hole was in a 1707 court case known as the "Tryals of Thomas Vaughan and Thomas Davis" in London, England, which involved the extortion of a man known in the documents only as Mr Guillam. At the time, gay sex in public places could lead to arrests by members of the Society for the Reformation of Manners. Often the authorities would wait outside the Lincoln's Inn bog house in London as one place to catch people. 

The courts heard that a man (Mr. Guillam) has visited a washroom stall to relieve himself, when another male put his penis through a hole in the wall ("a Boy in the adjoyning Vault put his Privy-member through a Hole"). Mr. Guillam, surprised by the action, fled the washroom, only to be followed by the male who cried out that he would have had sex with him. Mr. Guillam was then confronted by Mr. Vaughan who, knowing Mr. Guillam's innocence, threatened to turn him in to the police, and reveal him to his wife, if he did not pay a sum of money.

During the mid-1900s, police often used bathroom glory holes as an entrapment method for gay men, often recording the incidents as evidence to prosecute. Such incidents were recorded in California and Ohio in the 1950s and 1960s, with archival police footage of "tearooms" appearing on pornography websites, such as Pornhub. 

According to the Routledge Dictionary of Modern American Slang, the first time glory hole appears in print was in 1949, when an anonymously published glossary called Swasarnt Nerf's Gay Girl's Guide refers to a "Phallic size hole in partition between toilet booths. Sometimes used also for a mere peep-hole."

Another reference to glory holes appeared in Tearoom Trade: Impersonal Sex in Public Places, a controversial book published by sociologist Laud Humphreys in 1970, in which he suggests the "tearoom," or bathroom stall, as a prime space for men to congregate for sexual fulfilment. It would also later appear in the 1977 book The Joy of Gay Sex.

Public glory holes started to fade in popularity as the decriminalization of homosexuality was introduced in many countries, and concerns over HIV/AIDS changed gay culture. A 2001 study in the Journal of Homosexuality found that public glory holes remained popular among many gay men, "simply because they find the places exciting and/or convenient."

Despite the fading prominence of glory holes in public, some gay bath houses and sex clubs maintain the presence of glory holes in their establishment, and some people have acknowledged installing private glory hole walls inside their own homes. Bathroom sex remains a fetish for a subset of gay men, who will engage in similar anonymous acts below a bathroom stall separator, rather than through a hole.

In 2018, the Western Australian Museum added a "historic glory hole" to its collection. The hole had been situated in the toilet stall of the Albany Highway-side of the Gosnells train station, but was removed and saved in 1997 before the toilet was demolished.

A 2020 BuzzFeed article collected anecdotes from gay, straight, and bisexual readers recounting their experiences at swinger parties with glory holes present.

Legal and health concerns

Public sex of any kind is illegal in many parts of the world, and police undercover operations continue to be used in order to enforce such laws. Adverse personal consequences to participants in glory hole activity have included police surveillance, public humiliation in the press, often with marital and employment consequences, and imprisonment following a criminal conviction. Gay bashing, mugging, and bodily injury are further potential risks. For reasons of personal safety, as well as etiquette, men typically wait for a signal from the receptive partner to come through the hole before inserting any part of their genitals through a glory hole.

Potential health advantages 
In June 2020, a New York Health Department COVID-19 advisory suggested sex through "physical barriers, like walls," but did not specifically reference glory holes, as part of broader measures on dating and sex during the pandemic. 

About a month later, the British Columbia Centre for Disease Control went a step further with its COVID-19 precautionary recommendations by suggesting using "barriers, like walls (e.g., glory holes), that allow for sexual contact but prevent close face-to-face contact" as one way to lower the risk of exposure to the virus.

In popular culture
In pornography, glory holes are a recurring theme, particularly in gay videos, though not exclusively. Straight porn often features scenarios involving the partition; in some instances, it will involve kink mistresses, who see it as a form of women's sexual agency and mastery.

The early 20th century pornographic cartoon Eveready Harton in Buried Treasure depicts the use of an improvised glory hole for zoophilic purposes.

Jackass Number Two features a stunt where one of the cast members dresses his penis in a mouse costume and inserts it into a glory hole that feeds into a snake's cage.

In ‘The Illuminatus! Trilogy’ a glory hole, in the form of a giant golden apple with an opening in it, is used as part of the Discordian initiation ritual, leading to the main character wondering who or what is on the other side.

See also

 Cottaging – term referring to anonymous male–male sex in a public lavatory
 Gay bathhouse
 Gay beat
 Gay cruising in England and Wales
 Polari
 Troll (gay slang)

References

Further reading

 "The Little Black Book: This one can keep you out of trouble," (Lambda Legal Defense and Education Fund
 "Gloryholes" essay at rotten.com
 An article that gives legal advice on cruising for sex.
 
 
 
  (Includes several glory hole encounters by Navy members)
 
  (quote from the abstract)

External links

 A Sex Stop on the Way Home by Corey Kilgannon, New York Times, September 21, 2005
 The Little Black Book: This one can keep you out of trouble, Lambda Legal Defense and Education Fund; archived copy, pdf format, archived here. An article regarding legal issues of sex in public restrooms.

Sexuality and society
Casual sex
Pornography terminology
LGBT slang
Toilets
Sexual slang